Western Australian soccer clubs from the top three State-Based Divisions, plus the Premier Division of the Sunday League, competed in 2013 for the WA State Challenge Cup, known for sponsorship reasons as the Cool Ridge Cup.  This knockout competition was won by Bayswater City, their first title.

Preliminary round 

A total of 30 Western Australian teams took part in this stage of the competition. It involved 12 clubs from the State League Division 1, 8 clubs from the State League Division 2 and 10 clubs from the 2013 Sunday League (Premier Division). All matches in this round were completed on 1 April.
The draw was as follows:

 Byes:  BB United (5), Canning City (3), Dianella White Eagles (3), Fremantle Croatia (5), Joondalup City (4), Joondalup United (5), Melville City (4), Quinns FC (4), Shamrock Rovers Perth (3), Southern Spirit (5) and UWA-Nedlands (3),

First round
A total of 32 teams took part in this stage of the competition. 11 of the 12 Clubs from the State League Premier Division entered into the competition at this stage, with the exception of the Football West NTC team, who did not take part. All matches were completed by 28 April.

The draw was as follows:

Second round
A total of 16 teams took part in this stage of the competition. All matches were completed by 3 June.

The draw was as follows:

Quarter finals

A total of 8 teams took part in this stage of the competition.  All matches in this round were completed by 22 June.

The draw was as follows:

Semi finals

A total of 4 teams took part in this stage of the competition. All matches in this round were completed by 20 July. The draw was as follows:

Final 

The 2013 Cool Ridge Cup Final was held at the neutral venue of Litis Stadium on 24 August.

References

External links

Football West State Cup
2013 in Australian soccer